Rodrigo da Silveira (born 22 November 1920) was a Portuguese equestrian. He competed in two events at the 1956 Summer Olympics.

References

External links
  

1920 births
Possibly living people
Portuguese male equestrians
Olympic equestrians of Portugal
Equestrians at the 1956 Summer Olympics